FC Parva Atomna Kozloduy is a Bulgarian football club from the town of Kozloduy. The club currently competes in the North-West Third League.

History
The first football team of the town of Kozloduy is based in the 1950s. Then the teams played in regional groups of Vratsa. In 1974 after the founding of the Kozloduy NPP is based on current club. First named Parva atomna, but then after Hristo Botev. The biggest success of the club is 12th place in the B PFG during season 1976-1977. The team reaches 4 times to B PFG.

In 2016 the team returned to its original name Parva Atomna Kozloduy. Since the club was relegated in the end of the 2015–16 season, they were merged with Dunav Selanovtsi and joined the newly formed Bulgarian Third League. The team started with 15 players from the previous team.

Crest history

Current squad
As of 1 September 2011

Stadium
The Hristo Botev stadium was built in 1970 with only one stand, which is filled with benches. After modernization in 2008, the facility achieved a decent standard for the amateur football groups. Current capacity for the stadium is 3,000 people.

Past seasons

League positions

References

External links 
bgclubs.eu

Parva Atomna
1974 establishments in Bulgaria